Caloptilia aceriella is a moth of the family Gracillariidae. It is known from the United States (Massachusetts, California and Maine).

The larvae feed on Acer species, including Acer rubrum. They mine the leaves of their host plant.

References

aceriella
Moths of North America
Moths described in 1881